The year 2009 is the 13th year in the history of M-1 Global, a mixed martial arts promotion based in Russia. In 2009 M-1 Global held 27 events beginning with, M-1 Challenge 11: 2008 Challenge Finals.

Events list

M-1 Challenge 11: 2008 Challenge Finals

M-1 Challenge 11: 2008 Challenge Finals was an event held on January 11, 2009 in The Special Sports Centrum at Amstelveen, North Holland, Netherlands.

Results

M-1 Challenge 12: USA

M-1 Challenge 12: USA was an event held on February 21, 2009 at The Emerald Queen Casino in Tacoma, Washington.

Results

M-1 Challenge: 2009 Selections 1

M-1 Challenge: 2009 Selections 1 was an event held on March 13, 2009 at Yubileyny Sports Palace in Saint Petersburg, Leningrad Oblast, Russia.

Results

M-1 Challenge 13: Bulgaria

M-1 Challenge 13: Bulgaria was an event held on March 28, 2009 at The Sports Hall Mladost in Bourgas, Bulgaria.

Results

M-1 Challenge: 2009 Selections 2

M-1 Challenge: 2009 Selections 2 was an event held on April 19, 2009 at The Yubileyny Sports Palace in Saint Petersburg, Leningrad Oblast, Russia.

Results

M-1 Challenge 14: Japan

M-1 Challenge 14: Japan was an event held on April 29, 2009 at The Differ Ariake Arena in Tokyo, Japan.

Results

M-1 Challenge 15: Brazil

M-1 Challenge 15: Brazil was an event held on May 9, 2009 at The Esporte Clube Sirio in Sao Paulo, Brazil.

Results

M-1 Challenge: 2009 Selections 3

M-1 Challenge: 2009 Selections 3 was an event held on May 28, 2009 in Saint Petersburg, Leningrad Oblast, Russia.

Results

M-1 Challenge 16: USA

M-1 Challenge 16: USA was an event held on June 5, 2009 at Memorial Hall in Kansas City, Missouri, United States.

Results

M-1 Ukraine: Lviv Open Cup

M-1 Ukraine: Lviv Open Cup was an event held on June 14, 2009 in Lviv, Lviv Oblast, Ukraine.

Results

M-1 Challenge: 2009 Selections 4

M-1 Challenge: 2009 Selections 4 was an event held on June 24, 2009 in Saint Petersburg, Leningrad Oblast, Russia.

Results

M-1 Challenge 17: Korea

M-1 Challenge 17: Korea was an event held on July 4, 2009 at Olympic Hall in Seoul, South Korea.

Results

M-1: Donbas Open Mix Fight

M-1: Donbas Open Mix Fight was an event held on July 4, 2009 at The Sportmax Sports Complex in Donetsk, Donetsk Oblast, Ukraine.

Results

M-1 Challenge: 2009 Selections 5

M-1 Challenge: 2009 Selections 5 was an event held on July 22, 2009 at The Flying Dutchman in Saint Petersburg, Leningrad Oblast, Russia.

Results

M-1 Challenge 18: Netherlands Day One

M-1 Challenge 18: Netherlands Day One was an event held on August 15, 2009 at Studio 22 in Hilversum, Netherlands.

Results

M-1 Challenge 18: Netherlands Day Two

M-1 Challenge 18: Netherlands Day Two was an event held on August 16, 2009 at Studio 22 in Hilversum, Netherlands.

Results

M-1 Global: Breakthrough

M-1 Global: Breakthrough was an event held on August 28, 2009 at Memorial Hall in Kansas City, Kansas, United States.

Results

M-1 Challenge: 2009 Selections 6

M-1 Challenge: 2009 Selections 6 was an event held on September 5, 2009 at The President's Palace in Makhachkala, Dagestan, Russia.

Results

M-1 Ukraine: 2009 Selections 1

M-1 Ukraine: 2009 Selections 1 was an event held on September 20, 2009 at The Acco International Exhibition Center in Kyiv, Kyiv Oblast, Ukraine.

Results

M-1 Challenge 19: 2009 Semifinals

M-1 Challenge 19: 2009 Semifinals was an event held on September 26, 2009 in Rostov-on-Don, Rostov Oblast, Russia.

Results

M-1 Challenge: 2009 Selections 7

M-1 Challenge: 2009 Selections 7 was an event held on October 3, 2009 at The Moscow Martial Arts Center in Moscow, Russia.

Results

M-1 Challenge: 2009 Selections 8

M-1 Challenge: 2009 Selections 8 was an event held on October 4, 2009 at The Moscow Martial Arts Center in Moscow, Russia.

Results

M-1 Challenge: 2009 Selections 9

M-1 Challenge: 2009 Selections 9 was an event held on November 3, 2009 at The World Cinema Studio in Saint Petersburg, Leningrad Oblast, Russia.

Results

M-1 Ukraine: 2009 Selections 2

M-1 Ukraine: 2009 Selections 2 was an event held on November 12, 2009 at Simferopol Circus in Simferopol, Crimea, Ukraine.

Results

M-1 Ukraine: 2009 Selections 3

M-1 Ukraine: 2009 Selections 3 was an event held on November 29, 2009 at The Acco International Exhibition Center in Kyiv, Ukraine.

Results

M-1 Challenge 20: 2009 Finals

M-1 Challenge 20: 2009 Finals was an event held on December 3, 2009 at The Ice Palace Saint Petersburg in Saint Petersburg, Leningrad Oblast, Russia.

Results

M-1 Ukraine: 2009 Selections 4

M-1 Ukraine: 2009 Selections 4 was an event held on December 24, 2009 at The Acco International Exhibition Center in Kyiv, Ukraine.

Results

See also 
 M-1 Global

References

M-1 Global events
2009 in mixed martial arts